Puerto Rico Highway 252 (PR-252)  is a tertiary route located in Culebra, Puerto Rico. It goes from the PR-250 in the Port of Culebra (pier) near the town square and runs northwest until you reach the municipal roads that lead to Quintas de Culebra and Melones Beach.

Major intersections

See also

 List of highways numbered 252

References

External links
 

252
Culebra, Puerto Rico